Nicolas Le Floch is a French television crime drama that was first shown on France 2 on October 28, 2008. The series was created by Hugues Pagan. Each season contains 2 episodes for a total, by 2015, of 12 episodes.

The series is adapted from Jean-François Parot's novels Les Enquêtes de Nicolas Le Floch, commissaire au Châtelet.

The series is broadcast in the United States, Japan, Russia, Latin America, Europe and Africa.

Plot
Nicolas Le Floch is Commissaire of the Châtelet in 18th century Paris. Working for the Lieutenant General of Police Antoine de Sartine, and assisted by Inspector Pierre Bourdeau and others, he solves crimes at all levels of Parisian society — including the royal court — while pursuing a complicated love life.

Main characters
 Jérôme Robart : Nicolas Le Floch, Marquis de Ranreuil, Commissaire of the Châtelet (1-6)
 Mathias Mlekuz : Inspector Pierre Bourdeau (1-6)
 Norah Lehembre : Aimée of Arranet (5) 
 Vimala Pons (1-2) and Camille de Pazzis (3) : Marie de Langremont / La Satin / La Bichelière 
 François Caron : Antoine de Sartine, Lieutenant General of Police of Paris (1-4) and Minister of the Navy (5)
 Vincent Winterhalter : Doctor Guillaume Scemacgus, former naval surgeon  (1-5)
 Michaël Abiteboul : Charles-Henri Sanson, executioner of Châtelet (1-5)
 Jean-Marie Winling : M. de Noblecourt, former prosecutor (1-5)
 Marie Verdi : Catherine, cook of M. de Noblecourt (1-5)
 Sava Lolov : Count de La Borde, first servant of the king’s bedchamber (1-5)
 Claire Nebout : madame of Le Dauphin Couronné (1-5)
 Yves Lambrecht : Count of Arranet, Aimée's father (5)
 Pierre Banderet (1) and Jacques Frantz (5) : Monsieur de Saint-Florentin, minister of the king
 Pierre Remund : Louis XV (1-5)
 Louis Barraud : Louis XVI (5)
 Jules Sadoughi : child of Paris (1-3)
 Tom Novembre : Count of St. Germain (3-4)
 Nathalie Roussel : Queen Marie Leczinska (3-4)
 Thomas Chabrol : Le Noir (3-5)

Guest
 Carole Franck as Madame de Pompadour (Season 1, Ep. 1)
 Alexis Michalik as Lambert / Yves de Langremont (Season 1, Ep. 1)
 Jean-Paul Comart as Morande (Season 2, Ep. 2)
 Émilie Gavois-Kahn as La Duvernois (Season 3, Ep. 1)
 Étienne Chicot as The Count of Rhodes (Season 3, Ep. 2)
 Marianne Denicourt as Belle Aglae (Season 5, Ep. 1)
 Damien Bonnard as The barker (Season 5, Ep. 2)
 Agnès Soral as Dame Cahuet de Villiers (Season 6, Ep. 1)
 Nicolas Vaude as Baldo (Season 6, Ep. 2)

Season 1 (2008)
 Episode 1 : L'Homme au ventre de plomb - The Man with the Lead Stomach
 Episode 2 : L'Énigme des Blancs-Manteaux - The Blancs-Manteaux Enigma'

Season 2 (2009)
 Episode 3 : Le Fantôme de la Rue Royale - The Phantom of the Rue Royale Episode 4 : L’Affaire Nicolas Le Floch - The Nicolas Le Floch AffairSeason 3 (2010)
The episodes are original stories written by Hugues Pagan.

 Episode 5 : La Larme de Varsovie - The Tear of Warsaw Episode 6 : Le Grand Veneur - The Grand HuntsmanSeason 4 (2011)
The episodes are original stories written by Hugues Pagan.

 Episode 7 : Le Dîner de Gueux - The Rogue's Banquet Episode 8 : Le Crime de la rue des Francs-Bourgeois - The Rue des Francs-Bourgeois CaseSeason 5 (2013)
 Episode 9 : Le Crime de l’hôtel Saint-Florentin - Murder at the Hotel Saint-Florentin Episode 10 : Le Sang des farines - Blood in the FlourSeason 6 (2017-2018)
 Episode 11 : Le Cadavre anglais Episode 12 : Le Noyé du Grand canal''

Awards 
 Festival de la fiction TV de La Rochelle 2008 : Best music
 Festival du film de télévision de Luchon 2013 : People's choice

References

External links
 
 Website

2008 French television series debuts
French-language television shows
2000s French television series
2010s French television series
French crime drama television series